1. Liga Classic (1st League Classic in English) is the fourth tier of the Swiss football league system. The division is split into three groups of 16 teams, by geographical region. The league is operated by Premier League.

History

League Names
Since the creation in 1931, the league has been called :
 1931–1944 : 3. Liga
 1944–2000 : 2. Liga
 2000–2012 : 2. Liga Interregional (creation of Swiss Amateur League in 2000)
 2012–2014 : 1. Liga Classique
 2014–2022 : 1. Liga
 Since 2022 : 1. Liga Classic

Regional format

Group 1 contains teams from western Switzerland, which is generally French speaking.  Group 2 contains teams from Central Switzerland, which is mostly German speaking.  Group 3 contains teams from East Switzerland (and Liechtenstein) which contains German and Italian speaking regions.

Two teams in total are promoted at the end of the season to  Promotion League, determined by a play-off competition involving the top 2 teams in each group. The bottom 2 teams in each group are relegated from this division to the 2. Liga Interregional, which is the highest of the Amateur leagues in Swiss football, broken down into 5 regional groups.

Current season
The clubs in the league for the 2022–23 season:

Group 1
 CS Chênois
 FC Coffrane
 FC Concordia Lausanne
 Echallens Région
 FC Grand-Saconnex
 La Chaux-de-Fonds
 FC La Sarraz-Eclépens
 Martigny-Sports
 Meyrin
 FC Monthey
 Naters Oberwallis
 FC Portalban-Gletterens
 Servette FC II
 Sion II
 US Terre Sainte
 Vevey United

Group 2
 FC Bassecourt
 Black Stars
 Concordia Basel
 Delémont
 Dornach
 FC Emmenbrücke
 Köniz
 FC Langenthal
 Münsingen
 FC Muri
 Neuchâtel Xamax II
 FC Rotkreuz
 Schötz
 Solothurn
 Thun II
 Wohlen

Group 3
 AC Taverne
  Eschen/Mauren
 Freienbach
 Gossau
 Grasshopper Club II
 SV Höngg
 FC Kosova
 FC Kreuzlingen
 Linth 04
 Lugano II
 FC Paradiso
 Tuggen
 Uzwil
 Wettswil-Bonstetten
 FC Weesen
 Winterthur II

Winners
1st league classic champions, promoted and relegated teams :

External links 
  
 1. Liga Classic at Soccerway

4
Swiss
Professional sports leagues in Switzerland